María Miret Bofí (born 13 May 1995) is a Spanish retired football midfielder.

Career

Miret started playing football from 11 years old and quickly progressed through the academy at Levante. Miret has represented Spain at under-17 and under-19 level.

Personal life

In 2015, Miret appeared in the Spanish reality television series Cámbiame. After playing soccer in the United States, she took up CrossFit training. She continued this when she lived in China, where she also took up teaching. She participated in the 2019 Asia CrossFit Championship and was the only Spanish participant. On 27 December 2019, she married Inés Suanzes in Las Vegas, who she met while in Texas. In October 2020, Miret and her wife were both asked to leave China by the Chinese government due to Suanzes testing positive for having COVID-19 antibodies in her system.

References

1995 births
Living people
Spanish women's footballers
Levante UD Femenino players
Primera División (women) players
Women's association football midfielders
LGBT association football players
CE Sant Gabriel players